Iolaus aurivillii, Aurivillius' sapphire, is a butterfly in the family Lycaenidae. It is found in southern Nigeria, Cameroon, Gabon, the Republic of the Congo, the Democratic Republic of the Congo, Uganda, western Kenya and Zambia. The habitat consists of forests.

The larvae feed on Englerina gabonensis and Globimetula braunii.

References

Butterflies described in 1900
Iolaus (butterfly)
Taxa named by Julius Röber
Butterflies of Africa